London Film Week is an independent film festival that takes place annually in December. Launched in 2018, the purpose of the Festival is to promote international filmmaking. Previous selections included films by Céline Sciamma, Lee Chang-dong, Noah Baumbach, Yolande Zauberman, Takashi Miike, Kantemir Balagov, Martin Scorsese and Armando Iannucci.

The 2021 edition will take place in various locations across London from 6–12 December.

Awards Categories
Awards categories include:
 Best Film
 Best Director 
 Best Acting 
 Best Screenplay
 Best Short

Submission takes place via FilmFreeway.

Partner Cinemas
Screenings of the 2021 edition will take place at the Everyman Broadgate, Everyman Baker Street, Everyman Muswell Hill, the French Institute as well as The Cinema in the Arches.

See also
 Berlin Film Week
 BFI London Film Festival
 London Independent Film Festival
 London International Animation Festival
 London International Student Film Festival
 UK Film Festival

References

External links

Film festivals in London